This is a list of Members of Parliament (MPs) elected to the House of Commons of the United Kingdom by Scottish constituencies at the 2019 United Kingdom general election for the 58th Parliament of the United Kingdom (2019–present).

The list is sorted by the name of the MP. Changes of affiliation are noted at the bottom of the page.

Composition

MPs

By-elections
 2021 Airdrie and Shotts by-election

Footnotes

See also
 2019 United Kingdom general election in Scotland
 List of MPs elected in the 2019 United Kingdom general election
 List of MPs for constituencies in England (2019–present)
 List of MPs for constituencies in Northern Ireland (2019–present)
 List of MPs for constituencies in Wales (2019–present)

References

Scotland
2019-2
MPs